The 1939 Nevada Wolf Pack football team was an American football team that represented the University of Nevada in the Far Western Conference (FWC) during the 1939 college football season. In their first season under head coach Jim Aiken, the team compiled a 5–4 record (3–1 against conference opponents) and won the conference championship. Bob Robinett was a prominent player.

This was the Wolf Pack's last year as a member of the FWC as they went independent for the 1940 season.

Schedule

References

Nevada
Nevada Wolf Pack football seasons
Northern California Athletic Conference football champion seasons
Nevada Wolf Pack football